Asaphodes cinnabari is a species of moth in the family Geometridae. This species is endemic to New Zealand and can be found in Otago and Southland where it lives in alpine swampy habitat. Adults of this species are on the wing in November.

Taxonomy
This species was described by George Howes in 1912 as Larentia cinnabari using specimens collected by himself in the Garvie Mountains and at the Cinnabar Gold Company's claim in Central Otago. The species was originally discovered by his brother A. A. Howes at the Garvie Mountains. George Hudson discussed and illustrated this species under the name Xanthorhoe cinnabaris in his 1928 book The Butterflies and Moths of New Zealand. L. B. Prout proposed the subspecies Asaphodes cinnabari obsoleta, however this was synonymised by John S. Dugdale in 1988. In 1971 Dugdale assigned this species, called by him Xanthorhoe cinnabaris, to the genus Asaphodes. In 1988 Dugdale used the original description epithet cinnabari in his annotated catalogue of New Zealand Lepidoptera but confirmed his placement of this species into the genus Asaphodes. The holotype, collected at Nevis, is held at the Natural History Museum, London.

Description

Howes described the species as follows:

Distribution
This species is endemic to New Zealand. This species is found in Otago and Southland. Along with the type locality, this species has also been collected in locations such as at the Cinnabar Gold Company claim, Greenstone Valley, and Gorge Hill in Mossburn.

Biology and life cycle

The adults of this species is on the wing in November.

Host plants and habitat

The species is an alpine moth and has been collected amongst tussock in swampy habitat. A. cinnabari has been reared in captivity on Hypochaeris radicata.

Threats
The draining and destruction of the swampland habitat this species relies on has led to a decrease in the population of this species in Southland.

References

External links

Image of specimen used by Prout for description of synonym Xanthorhoe cinnabari obsoleta

Larentiinae
Moths described in 1912
Moths of New Zealand
Endemic fauna of New Zealand
Taxa named by George Howes (entomologist)
Endemic moths of New Zealand